Christella normalis, synonym Thelypteris kunthii, sometimes known as Kunth's maiden fern or southern shield fern, is the most common of the maiden ferns in the southeastern United States south of the fall line.  It ranges westward to eastern Texas. It usually grows in moist to dry terrestrial situations, but can also be epipetric.  It often grows as a greenhouse escape in areas north of its usual range.

References

Lellinger, David B. A Field Manual of the Ferns & Fern-Allies of the United States & Canada. Smithsonian Institution, Washington, DC. 1985.

External links

Wunderlin, R. P., B. F. Hansen, A. R. Franck, and F. B. Essig. 2019. Atlas of Florida Plants (http://florida.plantatlas.usf.edu/). [S. M. Landry and K. N. Campbell (application development), USF Water Institute.] Institute for Systematic Botany, University of South Florida, Tampa.

Thelypteridaceae
Flora of the Southeastern United States